Starry Eyed may refer to:

 "Starry Eyed" (Michael Holliday song), released in 1960
 "Starry Eyed" (Ellie Goulding song), released in 2010
 Starry-eyed idealist, a pejorative use of the term do-gooder or goody two-shoes, often used to describe an unadvised virtuous person

See also
 Starry Eyes, a 2014 horror film
 "Starry Eyes", a song by the Records from Shades in Bed
 "Starry Eyes", a song by the Weeknd from Dawn FM